Denis Island Airport  is an airstrip serving Denis Island in the Seychelles.

Airlines and Destinations

See also

Transport in Seychelles
List of airports in Seychelles

References

External links
OpenStreetMap - Denis Island
OurAirports - Denis Island
FallingRain - Denis Island Airport

Airports in Seychelles